"Estoy Aquí" is a song by Colombian singer-songwriter Shakira, taken from her third studio album Pies Descalzos (1995). It was released in 1995 by Sony Music and Columbia Records as the lead single from the album. The song was written and produced by Shakira and Luis Fernando Ochoa. "Estoy Aquí" is a Latin pop song that lyrically discusses a willingness to correct a failed relationship.

Upon its release, "Estoy Aquí" received generally favorable reviews from music critics, who recognized it as a stand-out track from Pies Descalzos. Additionally, it became Shakira's first recording to attain commercial success outside her native Colombia. The song peaked at numbers 1 and 2 on the Billboard Latin Pop Songs and Latin Songs component charts. Its performance aided its parent album in becoming her breakthrough record, which eventually attained platinum certifications in Brazil, Colombia, and the United States. Its accompanying music video depicts Shakira performing the track, where she is often pictured with her guitar.

A Portuguese-language translation of the track titled "Estou Aqui" appeared on Shakira's first remix album The Remixes in 1997. An English-language version, "I Am Here", was leaked to the internet in 2011. The song has additionally been performed during six of the seven concert tours Shakira has held to date.

Background and composition

Shakira released her first major-label studio album Pies Descalzos in 1995 by Sony Music and Columbia Records. Assuming a prominent position in its production, she co-wrote and co-produced each of the eleven tracks included on the record. Serviced as the lead single from the project in 1996, "Estoy Aquí" saw additional songwriting and production from Luis Fernando Ochoa. The track is heavily influenced by Latin pop elements, and makes use of prominent guitar instrumentation. Lyrically, it states a desire to amend a failed relationship. In English, the lyrics "lo que nos pasó no repetirá jamás" and "Estoy aquí queriéndote, ahogándome" translate to "what happened to us will never be repeated" and "I'm here wanting you, drowning", respectively.
After attaining success with the original Spanish-language version, "Estoy Aquí" was re-recorded in Portuguese as "Estou Aqui" for Shakira's 1997 remix album The Remixes. An English-language version "I'm Here" was leaked in early-2011, but was not made available for digital download.

Reception
Upon its release, "Estoy Aquí" received generally favorable reviews from music critics, who recognized it as a stand-out track from Pies Descalzos. Carlos Quintana of About.com complimented the track for featuring a "vibrant dancing flavor", and placed it among his personal favorites from the record. Similarly, Jose F. Promis from Allmusic praised it for serving as an "infectious and melodic" opening track, going on to select the song as an album highlight. The song received a nomination for Pop Song of the Year at the 1997 Lo Nuestro Awards, but lost to  "Experiencia Religiosa" by Enrique Iglesias.

"Estoy Aquí" became Shakira's first recording to attain commercial success. The song peaked at numbers 1 and 2 on the Billboard Latin Pop Songs and Latin Songs component charts.  Its commercial performance aided its parent album in becoming her breakthrough record, which eventually attained platinum certifications in Brazil, and the United States. Pies Descalzos was also awarded the "Diamond Prism" award in Colombia.

In 1996, "Estoy Aquí" was included in the reissue of Pies Descalzos, titled Colección de Oro. In 2002, it was featured as the opening track for Shakira's first greatest hits album Grandes Éxitos.

Music video

"Estoy Aquí" became the first track by Shakira to receive an accompanying music video, which was directed by Simon Brand. The setting depicts a barn during the various weather seasons, and shows Shakira performing the song, accompanied with a guitar in most scenes. The clip was met with a favorable response from her label Sony Music, and was also met with commercial success. Consequentially, executives decided to place additional emphasis on promoting Pies Descalzos if it were to exceed sales of 50,000 copies. John Lannert from Billboard positively noted that her voice and appearance "jumps out at you".  In Colombia, it was recognized as the "Best Video" at the Asociación Colombiana de Periodistas del Espectáculo (ACPE) Awards.
After the huge success of the single in Latin America and Spain, Shakira filmed an alternate music video for the song, directed by French photographer and filmmaker Christophe Gstalder, this music video was used to promote the song in European countries and was marketed as "Estoy Aquí (European Mix)". This alternate music video depicts Shakira playing the guitar and dancing, posing seductively behind an aquarium and setting her guitar on fire. This alternate video also has the English version called "I'm Here" but was never released. However, the clip appeared on a French television interview Star Story.

Live performances
Shakira has performed "Estoy Aquí" during six of her seven concert tours thus far. She first performed the track in Mexico City during her Tour Pies Descalzos, which ran from 1996 through 1997. It was also included during the Tour Anfibio and Tour of the Mongoose, held in support of her second and third studio albums Dónde Están los Ladrones? and Laundry Service, respectively. The song was additionally performed during the Oral Fixation Tour, which became her largest tour to date. In place of its inclusion in The Sun Comes Out World Tour, "Estoy Aquí" was performed in Rio de Janeiro as part of Rock in Rio in 2011. Later in 2018 the song served as an opening song for her El Dorado World Tour.

In August 1999, Shakira sang "Estoy Aquí" during an episode of MTV Unplugged in New York City. In February 2000, the performance was included in the live album of the event. At the 12th Latin Grammy Awards ceremony in 2011, Mexican singer-songwriter Aleks Syntek performed a live cover of the song as part of the Latin Grammys tribute to Shakira, where she was honored Latin Recording Academy Person of the Year.

Cover versions
Mexican singer-songwriter Carla Morrison released an acoustic version of the song on February 4, 2022.

Track listings
CD single
"Estoy Aquí"
"Te Espero Sentada"

CD single - Brazil version
"Estou Aqui"

Remix EP
"Estoy Aquí" (The Love & House Mix)
"Estoy Aquí" (The Love & House Radio Edit)
"Estoy Aquí" (Extended Club Mix)
"Estoy Aquí" (The Radio Edit)
"Estoy Aquí" (Meme's Timbalero Dub)
"Estoy Aquí" (The Love & Tears Mix)

Charts

Weekly charts

Year-end charts

See also
List of Billboard Latin Pop Airplay number ones of 1996

References

1995 singles
Shakira songs
Spanish-language songs
Songs written by Shakira
Songs written by Luis Fernando Ochoa
Music videos directed by Simon Brand
1995 songs
Sony Music singles